Waiting for healthcare refers to any waiting period experienced by a patient before or during medical treatment. Waiting to get an appointment with a physician, staying in a waiting room before an appointment, and being observed during a physician's watchful waiting are different concepts in waiting for healthcare.

When a patient is waiting, their family and friends may also be waiting for an outcome. Waiting time influences patient satisfaction. Patients can spend longer waiting for treatment than actually receiving treatment.

Some experts have suggested that patient waiting rooms in hospitals be integrated with the other rooms providing patient care so that information updates can come freely to anyone waiting. Time in the waiting room has been used to experiment with giving patient health education.

In 2014 the Patient-Centered Outcomes Research Institute began funding a study for improving the waiting room experience.

Patients who are waiting for surgery depend on the availability of the operating theater, and if any patient getting treatment in that room takes longer than scheduled, all patients who are waiting to be next must wait beyond their appointed time. It can be difficult to maximize efficient use of the operating room when unexpected delays can happen and lead to patients waiting.

References

Medical terminology
Time management